Tonoloway Ridge is a stratigraphic ridge that runs southwest northeast through the U.S. states of Pennsylvania, Maryland, and West Virginia. It reaches its highest elevation above mean sea level of 1,292 feet (393.8 m) at a knob on its southern end in Morgan County, West Virginia. Tonoloway Ridge is separated by gaps at Great Cacapon on the Potomac River and at Little Tonoloway Creek where it is traversed by Interstate 68 in Maryland.

Ridges of Morgan County, West Virginia
Landforms of Washington County, Maryland
Ridges of West Virginia
Ridges of Maryland
Ridges of Pennsylvania
Landforms of Fulton County, Pennsylvania